Aajuitsup Tasia (old spelling: Aujuitsup Tasia) is a large lake in central-western Greenland, in the Qeqqata municipality. Aajuitsup Tasia is an oligotrophic lake of  depth, covering an area of 1,350ha.

Geography 
The 2x10 km lake is separated from the Akuliarusiarsuup Kuua valley and Kangerlussuaq in the south by a low tundra ridge − part of the Kangaamiut dike swarm. To the west lies a sibling Sanningasoq twin lake. To the north-east lies the wide highland of Isunngua.

The surface of Aajuitsup Tasia is almost level with the surface of the neighboring meltwater lake, an outflow of Russell Glacier. The altitude differential produces an outflowing boggy stream flowing from Aajuitsup Tasia to the unnamed meltwater lake, allowing Aajuitsup Tasia to retain its freshwater character despite being directly in the glacier outflow path.

Photographs

References

External links 
 Underwater photography in the lake at Tropica Aquarium Plants

Kangerlussuaq
Lakes of Greenland